Scientists for Labour is a socialist society affiliated to the British Labour Party.  It is open to supporters of the Labour Party interested or involved in UK science and technology. Notable patrons include the Nobel Prize winning geneticist, Sir Paul Nurse FRS, the businessman and Chancellor of the University of Cambridge, Lord David Sainsbury, and the former Prime Minister, Dr. Gordon Brown. Its stated aims are to be a strong political voice for science, to improve the understanding of science within the Labour Party and nationally, and to advise the parliamentary Labour Party on science policy issues. SfL organise a range of events, including panel discussions, networking meetings, and collaboration.

History

Scientists for Labour was founded in 1994 by the Scottish molecular virologist Willie Russell, amongst others, to be a vehicle for scientists within the Labour Party. SfL tried to lobby the Labour Party before the 1997 UK general election to pledge the creation of a cabinet level secretary of science, something that it was unsuccessful in doing, though it is still a policy that the group supports. During the 2000s, the group submitted evidence on science policy to the Science and Technology Select Committee. 

During the COVID-19 pandemic, the organisation began to publish regular reports on the science around COVID-19, including both daily briefings and long form reports. These reports have earned SfL public praise from prominent Labour figures including the Leader of the Labour Party Sir Keir Starmer KCB QC MP, and former Prime Minister Dr. Gordon Brown HonFRSE. These reports have been on topics such as the impact of COVID-19 on BAME communities in the U.K., the handling Scottish government's handling of COVID-19, the importance of ensuring that research can continue in spite of pandemic conditions, the importance of the transparency in government scientific advice, and the importance of maintaining links with European scientists both during and after the COVID-19 pandemic. Previous members of the Executive Committee include the chemical physicist Benjamin J. Whitaker, and as of July 2022 current members of the executive committee include the politician and teacher Martin Whitfield.

National Executive Committee 
The 2022-23 SfL NEC are as follows:

Chair: Izzy Creed

Vice Chair Policy: Conor Cooper

Vice Chair Membership: Paul Henry

Treasurer: Daniel Villar

Secretary: Avesta Afshari-Mehr

Membership Secretary: Juna Sathian

Co-Webmasters: Kartik Kavi & Avesta Afshari-Mehr

Other Committee Members: Sanjush Dalmia; Alex Greer; Martin Whitfield; Harry Stratton

Notable Members 

 Chi Onwurah MP
 Martin Whitfield MSP
 Benjamin J. Whitaker, Physicist
 Sir Paul Nurse FRS, Geneticist
 Lord David Sainsbury HonFRS HonFREng, Chancellor at the University of Cambridge
 Dr. Gordon Brown, Former Prime Minister

Local Branches 

 Newcastle upon Tyne Central - established in July 2020. Chaired by Juna Sathian, who is also the Membership Secretary of SfL.
 Ealing - established in September 2021. A wider London branch is set to be created in 2023.

References

External links
 Scientists for Labour

Labour Party (UK) socialist societies